is a district of Japan located in western Kanagawa Prefecture, Japan. Most of the mountainous district is sparsely populated, and is part of the Fuji-Hakone-Izu National Park. The majority of the area of the city of Odawara was formerly part of Ashigarashimo District.

As of 2009, the district had an estimated population of 48,713 and a density of 346 persons per km2. The total area was 140.73 km2.

Towns and villages 
Hakone
Yugawara
Manazuru

History

The area was under control of the later Hōjō clan in the Sengoku period, and part of Odawara Domain during the Edo period. Following disasters caused by eruptions of nearby Mount Fuji, a portion also came to be held as tenryō territory administered by the Tokugawa shogunate.

Timeline
After the Meiji Restoration, it initially formed part of the short-lived Ashigara Prefecture, before was established as a district of Kanagawa Prefecture under the cadastral reform of 1878. In 1889, it was administratively divided into two towns (Odawara and Hakone) and 30 villages. On December 20, 1940, Odawara was elevated to city status. A planned merger of Yugawara into Odawara in 2005 was rejected by local voters in an August 8, 2004 referendum.

Merger table

Districts in Kanagawa Prefecture